Bălţaţi may refer to several places in Romania:

 Bălțați, a commune in Iaşi County
 Bălţaţi, a village in Scorniceşti Town, Olt County
 Bălţaţi, a village in Tătărăni Commune, Vaslui County
 Bălţaţi, a former name for Stejaru, Teleorman, Teleorman County

and to:

Bălţaţi, a village in Ţipala Commune, Ialoveni district, Moldova